Kayapa, officially the Municipality of Kayapa, is a 3rd class municipality in the province of Nueva Vizcaya, Philippines. According to the 2020 census, it has a population of 26,469 people.

History
In 1754, Governor-General Don Arandia sent Comandante Dovilla, who was based in Pangasinan, to establish a civil government and spread Christianity among the non-Christian Tribes. The mission first saw the Valley of Yapa (Yapa meaning bountiful) which was inhabited by the Allagots, the second descendants of the Bormangi and Owak, and the third descendants of the Kalanguya, Ibaloi, Ilo-o, and Karao tribes who settled in the fertile valley. When the comandante (commander) and his company arrived in the valley of Yapa, the villagers entertained them under a big tree called “Kalabao”, which stood in the middle of the valley. It was from these words “Kalabao” and “Yapa” where the present name “Kayapa” was coined.
On January 29, 1915, Governor-General Francis Burton Harrison signed and issued Executive Order No. 9, transferring all territories of the former Spanish Commandancia of Kayapa, except the area which lies within the Benguet watershed of the Agno River, from the sub-Province of Benguet to the Province of Nueva Vizcaya. On November 11, 1950, President Elpidio Quirino signed Executive Order No. 368, proclaiming the Municipality of Kayapa as a regular town, thus, merging Kayapa and Pingkian into one town as it is today.

Geography

Barangays
Kayapa is politically subdivided into 30 barangays. These barangays are headed by elected officials: Barangay Captain, Barangay Council, whose members are called Barangay Councilors. All are elected every three years.

Climate

Demographics

Economy

Government
Kayapa, belonging to the lone congressional district of the province of Nueva Vizcaya, is governed by a mayor designated as its local chief executive and by a municipal council as its legislative body in accordance with the Local Government Code. The mayor, vice mayor, and the councilors are elected directly by the people through an election which is being held every three years.

Elected officials

Education
The Schools Division of Nueva Vizcaya governs the town's public education system. The division office is a field office of the DepEd in Cagayan Valley region. The office governs the public and private elementary and public and private high schools throughout the municipality.

Gallery

References

External links

[ Philippine Standard Geographic Code]
Philippine Census Information
Local Governance Performance Management System

Municipalities of Nueva Vizcaya
Establishments by Philippine executive order